Derrick Terrell Simmons (born December 12, 1976) is an American politician who is currently a Democratic member of the Mississippi Senate, serving since 2011. In 2013, Simmons proposed a legislative amendment that would expand Medicaid; the amendment was defeated.

In addition to his legislative duties, Simmons is a trial lawyer. He has an MBA and a JD from Howard University.

References

External links
 
 Legislative website
 Twitter account

1976 births
21st-century American politicians
African-American state legislators in Mississippi
Living people
Democratic Party Mississippi state senators
21st-century African-American politicians
20th-century African-American people